This is a list of blacksmith shops.  This is intended to include any notable current ones operating as businesses, as well as historic ones that are operational or not.  It includes numerous ones in open-air museums.  Some of the historic blacksmith shops are contributing buildings in historic districts.

Australia
Deasland, Ginninderra, Canberra
Historic Village Herberton, Herberton, Queensland
Coppabella Blacksmith Shop, Rosewood, Greater Hume Shire, New South Wales
Honeysuckle Point Railway Workshops, Newcastle, New South Wales
Warrawagine,  Pilbara region, Western Australia

Canada
South Peace Centennial Museum, open-air museum, Beaverlodge, Alberta
Pioneer Acres Museum, museum north of Irricana, Alberta
Kings Landing Historical Settlement, New Brunswick
Upper Canada Village, near Morrisburg, Ontario
Lang Pioneer Village Museum, Peterborough County, Ontario
Black Creek Pioneer Village, Toronto, Ontario
Mossbank, Saskatchewan

United Kingdom
Tooley's Boatyard, Banbury, Oxfordshire, England
Wayside Folk Museum, Zennor, west Cornwall, England
Beck Isle Museum, Pickering, North Yorkshire, England.
Ryhope Engines Museum, Sunderland, Tyne and Wear, England
Bishops Lydeard Mill and Rural Life Museum,  Bishops Lydeard, Somerset, England
Burwell Museum, Burwell, Cambridgeshire, England
Gretna Green, Dumfries and Galloway, Scotland

United States
Alabama
Preuit Oaks, Colbert County, Alabama, NRHP-listed

Arizona
Sahuaro Ranch, north of Glendale, Arizona
Pioneer Living History Museum, museum, Phoenix, Arizona

Arkansas
Jacob Wolf House, Norfork, Arkansas

California
Irvine Blacksmith Shop, Irvine, CA, NRHP-listed
Old Borges Ranch, Contra Costa County, California
Old Town San Diego State Historic Park, San Diego, California
Great Sierra Mine Historic Site, Yosemite National Park, California

Colorado
Bimson Blacksmith Shop, Berthoud, Colorado, NRHP-listed
Rock Ledge Ranch Historic Site, open-air museum, Colorado Springs, Colorado
Romeo Block, Denver, Colorado
Wiley Rock Schoolhouse, 603 Main St., Wiley, Colorado, NRHP-listed

Connecticut
William Gorton Farm, East Lyme, Connecticut
Griswold House (Guilford, Connecticut)

Delaware
Hickman Blacksmith Shop and House, Marshallton, Delaware, NRHP-listed

Florida
Barberville Central High School, Barberville, Florida
Blacksmith Shop (St. Augustine, Florida)

Georgia
Central of Georgia Depot and Trainshed, Savannah, Georgia
Georgia State Railroad Museum, Savannah, Georgia

Illinois
John Deere House and Shop, Grand Detour, Illinois
Hicks Locomotive and Car Works, Chicago Heights, Illinois
Streibich Blacksmith Shop, Newman, IL, NRHP-listed

Iowa
Quasdorf Blacksmith and Wagon Shop, Dows, IA, NRHP-listed
Matthew Edel Blacksmith Shop and House, Haverhill, IA, NRHP-listed
Bigler Building, Clermont, Iowa
Quasdorf Blacksmith and Wagon Shop (1899), Dows, Iowa, NRHP-listed
Forest Park Museum and Arboretum, near Perry, Iowa

Kansas
Blacksmith Creek Bridge, Topeka, KS, NRHP-listed
Cuba Blacksmith Shop, Cuba, KS, NRHP-listed
Transue Brothers Blacksmith & Wagon Shop, Summerfield, KS, NRHP-listed
Holmberg and Johnson Blacksmith Shop, Lindsborg, KS, NRHP-listed
Holmberg and Johnson Blacksmith Shop, Lindsborg, Kansas

Kentucky
Joy, Kentucky

Louisiana
Lafitte's Blacksmith Shop, New Orleans, LA, NRHP-listed
Kent Plantation House, Alexandria, Rapides Parish, Louisiana
Oak Alley Plantation, Vacherie, St. James Parish, Louisiana 
Whitney Plantation Historic District, near Wallace, St. John the Baptist Parish, Louisiana
Plaquemine Historic District, Plaquemine, Louisiana, NRHP-listed

Maine
Chandler-Parsons Blacksmith Shop, Dover-Foxcroft, ME, NRHP-listed
Chandler-Parsons Blacksmith Shop, Dover-Foxcroft, Maine
Larsson–Noak Historic District, New Sweden, Maine
Stearns Hill Farm, West Paris, Maine

Maryland
Oakland Mills Blacksmith House and Shop, Columbia, MD, NRHP-listed
G. Krug & Son Ironworks and Museum, Baltimore, Maryland
Mount Clare Shops, Baltimore, Maryland
Stone Hall (Cockeysville, Maryland)
Oakland Mills Blacksmith House and Shop, Oakland Mills, Maryland, NRHP-listed

Massachusetts
George I. Briggs House, Bourne, Massachusetts
Robert Strong Woodward House and Studio, Buckland, Massachusetts, NRHP-listed
Old Chelmsford Garrison House, Chelmsford, Massachusetts, historic house museum
Uxbridge Common District, Uxbridge, Massachusetts

Michigan
Benjamin Blacksmith Shop, Mackinac Island, Michigan
Calumet and Hecla Industrial District, Michigan
Arthur Silliman House, Three Rivers, Michigan

Minnesota
J. A. Johnson Blacksmith Shop, Rothsay, Minnesota
North Oaks Farm, North Oaks, Minnesota, an open-air museum
City Blacksmith Shop, Lamberton, MN, NRHP-listed
J.A. Johnson Blacksmith Shop, Rothsay, MN, NRHP-listed
Bally Blacksmith Shop, Grand Marais, MN, NRHP-listed

Mississippi
Ravennaside, Natchez, Mississippi, NRHP-listed

Missouri
Dr. James Compton House, Kansas City, Missouri

Montana
Boyd's Shop, Kalispell, Montana
Gildersleeve Mine, Mineral County, Montana

Nebraska
Blacksmith Shop, Bellevue, NE, NRHP-listed
Cook Blacksmith Shop, Ponca, NE, NRHP-listed
Cook Blacksmith Shop, Ponca, Nebraska
Crossfire Forge, Ainsworth,  Nebraska 
New Jersey
Glanville Blacksmith Shop, Morristown, NJ, NRHP-listed

New Mexico
Santa Fe Railway Shops (Albuquerque), New Mexico

New York
Mixter Blacksmith Shop, Warrensburg, NY, NRHP-listed
Alloway, New York
Farmers' Museum, Cooperstown, New York
A. Newton Farm, Orleans, New York
Hildreth-Lord-Hawley Farm, Pittsford, New York
Old Stone Shop, a double blacksmith shop, Lyme, New York, NRHP-listed
Rowe Farm, South Bethlehem, Albany County, New York
Thorne Memorial School, Millbrook, New York
Grooms Tavern Complex, Saratoga County, New York
Hubbell Family Farm and Kelly's Corners Cemetery, Kelly's Corners, Delaware County, New York
George Westinghouse Jr. Birthplace and Boyhood Home, Central Bridge, Schoharie County, New York

North Carolina
Marion Jasper Jordan Farm, near Gulf, Chatham County, North Carolina
John C. Campbell Folk School, Brasstown, North Carolina
Baldwin's Mill, near Pittsboro, Chatham County, North Carolina
Oakdale Cotton Mill Village, Jamestown, North Carolina; the smithy is a contributing building in an NRHP-listed historic district
Bray-Paschal House, near Siler City, Chatham County, North Carolina

Ohio
Henry Stoffel Blacksmith Shop, Sandusky, OH, NRHP-listed
Hale Farm and Village, Bath Township, Summit County, Ohio

Oklahoma
Blacksmith's House, Pawhuska, OK, NRHP-listed
Owl Blacksmith Shop, Weatherford, OK, NRHP-listed
Post Blacksmith Shop, Fort Gibson, OK, NRHP-listed

Oregon
Hayse Blacksmith Shop, Eugene, OR, NRHP-listed
Svenson Blacksmith Shop, Astoria, OR, NRHP-listed
Vinsonhaler Blacksmith Shop, Nyssa, OR, NRHP-listed
Windischar's General Blacksmith Shop, Mount Angel, OR, NRHP-listed
Philip Foster Farm, Eagle Creek, Oregon
Rogue River Ranch, Curry County, Oregon 
Hayse Blacksmith Shop, Eugene, Oregon
Svenson Blacksmith Shop, Astoria, Oregon

Pennsylvania
Brown-Moore Blacksmith Shop, Merrittstown, PA, NRHP-listed
Reiff Farm with blacksmith shop from 1742, Oley Township, Berks County, Pennsylvania, NRHP-listed
Strode's Mill Historic District, East Bradford Township, Chester County, Pennsylvania
Altoona Works, Altoona, Pennsylvania
Jacob Leiby Farm, Perry Township, Berks County, Pennsylvania
Mary Ann Furnace Historic District, Longswamp Township, Berks County, Pennsylvania
Minersville Coke Ovens, Carbon Township, Huntingdon County, Pennsylvania
Colver Historic District,  Cambria County, Pennsylvania
Fort Hunter Historic District, Fort Hunter, Pennsylvania
Cambria Iron Company, Johnstown, Pennsylvania
Waterloo Mills Historic District, Easttown Township, Chester County, Pennsylvania
Compass Inn, Laughlintown, Pennsylvania
New Holland Machine Company, New Holland, Pennsylvania
Hans Herr House, West Lampeter Township, Lancaster County, Pennsylvania

Rhode Island
George Fayerweather Blacksmith Shop, Kingstown, RI, NRHP-listed
Smith–Appleby House, Smithfield, Rhode Island
Henry Eldred Farm, South Kingstown, Rhode Island

South Carolina
Senn's Grist Mill-Blacksmith Shop-Orange Crush Bottling Plant, Summerton, South Carolina, NRHP-listed

South Dakota
G.L. Stocker Blacksmith Shop, Gettysburg, SD, NRHP-listed

Tennessee
Fruitvale, Tennessee
John Geist and Sons Blacksmith Shop and House, Nashville, TN, NRHP-listed
Andy Wood Log House and Willie Wood Blacksmith Shop, Georgetown, TN, NRHP-listed

Texas
Freeze Building (1887), San Angelo, Texas
List of museums in the Texas Panhandle, Texas

Utah
Fugal Blacksmith Shop, Pleasant Grove, UT, NRHP-listed

Vermont
Old Stone Blacksmith Shop, Cornwall, Vermont, NRHP-listed

Virginia
Jackson Blacksmith Shop, Goochland, Virginia, NRHP-listed
Weston (Casanova, Virginia)
Appomattox Iron Works, Petersburg, Virginia
Brook Hill Farm, near Forest, Bedford County, Virginia
Cyrus McCormick Farm, Rockbridge County, Virginia
Frederick County Poor Farm, Round Hill, Virginia
Snowville Historic District, Snowville, Pulaski County, Virginia
Sunnydale Farm, near Pound, Wise County, Virginia, NRHP-listed

Washington
Stella Blacksmith Shop, Stella, WA, NRHP-listed

West Virginia
Pickaway Rural Historic District, blacksmith shop built c.1800, Pickaway, West Virginia, NRHP-listed

Wisconsin
Ritger Wagonmaking and Blacksmith Shop, Hartford, WI, NRHP-listed
Kuehn Blacksmith Shop-Hardware Store, Kaukauna, WI, NRHP-listed
Bartlett Blacksmith Shop-Scandinavian Hotel, Galesville, WI, NRHP-listed
Vaughn's Hall and Blacksmith Shop, Montello, WI, NRHP-listed
Pokrandt Blacksmith Shop, Waukesha, WI, NRHP-listed
Cleveland's Hall and Blacksmith Shop, Brooklyn, WI, NRHP-listed
Goodrich Blacksmith Shop, Milton, WI, NRHP-listed
Cleveland's Hall and Blacksmith Shop, Brooklyn, Green County, Wisconsin
Old World Wisconsin, an open-air museum, Waukesha County, Wisconsin

References